Reno is the surname of:

Don Reno (1927–1984), American country musician
Ginette Reno (born 1946), French-Canadian author
Ittie Kinney Reno (1862–1941), American novelist and social leader
Janet Reno (1938–2016), former attorney general of the United States
Jean Reno (born 1948), French actor
Jesse L. Reno (1823–1862), American military general during the Mexican–American War, and the American Civil War
Jesse W. Reno (1861–1947), American inventor of the escalator
Marcus Reno (1834–1889), American cavalry officer, participated in the Battle of Little Big Horn
Mike Reno (born 1955), Canadian rock musician
Tony Reno (born 1963), Swedish rock musician
Walter E. Reno (1881–1917), American naval officer
Franklin (Frank), John, Simeon (Sim) and William (Bill) Reno, members of the Reno Gang (died 1868), an American Civil War criminal gang
Reno (comedian), American stand-up comedian born Karen Reno in 1956